The First Chen–Chiang summit was the first of a series of what would later become the Chen-Chiang summit of cross-strait meetings.   The meeting was held between the Association for Relations Across the Taiwan Straits (ARATS) represented by Chen Yun-lin and Straits Exchange Foundation (SEF) represented by Chiang Pin-kung.  This meeting followed the 1993 Wang-Koo summit.

Meeting
The summit was a quick meeting that took place on 13 June 2008 in Beijing.  Two agreements were signed.  The first agreement was signed for weekend cross-strait chartered flights.  The second agreement was signed for mainland tourists' travel to Taiwan island.  The documents were signed in simplified Chinese characters and traditional Chinese characters and then exchanged.

Both claimed this atmosphere was very different compared to the 1993 Wang-Koo summit, when both were signing for China status.  The wife of Chen and the wife of Chiang also entered the summit holding each other's hands and the atmosphere appeared happy.

See also
 Cross-Strait relations
 Chen–Chiang summit

References

2008 in China
Cross-Strait relations